War-Dyabe ibn Rabis or War Jabi, also known as: War Jaabi or War-Dyabe or War-Ndyay, was the king of Tekrur.  He converted to Islam around 1030 and his subjects did the same to imitate him. During his reign, he will be responsible for expanding the kingdom. [2],. Following the attacks on the Muslims of Tekrour by animists who were afraid of the growing influence of Islam in the kingdom, he called on his Almoravid allies who helped him to take power. This led to the migration of the latter to the Baol and Sine.

Under his reign, he expanded the kingdom by conquering other territories. Its rapprochement with the Almoravids benefits the kingdom economically and creates greater political ties between the Muslim state of North Africa and Tekrour. Later, in view of the many conflicts between the opponents in Ghana, they will end up conquering the kingdom with the help of the Almoravids by taking its capital Koumbi Saleh.

He died in 433 Hijri (1040 or 1041 Gregorian), succeeded by his son Labi.

See also

Takrur
Bambuk

Sources
Barry, Boubacar. Senegambia and the Atlantic slave trade, (Cambridge: University Press, 1998) p. 6
Clark, Andrew F. and Lucie Colvin Phillips. Historical Dictionary of Senegal: Second Edition, (Metuchen, New Jersey: Scrarecrow Press, 1994) pp. 18; 265
Fage, J. D.; Oliver, Roland Anthony, "The Cambridge History of Africa: From c. 500 B.C. to A.D. 1050", Cambridge University Press (1975), p. 485,  -  last retrieved 20 June 2022
Cohen, Robert Z., Discovering the Empire of Ghana, The Rosen Publishing Group, Inc. (2013), p. 39,  -  last retrieved 20 June 2022

Notes

Serer history

History of Senegal
History of the Gambia
Converts to Islam
Former monarchies of Africa